Needle Hill or Cham Shan is a mountain in New Territories, Hong Kong. It has an altitude of 532 m. This is a part of a popular hiking route including Grassy Hill and Tai Mo Shan. The mountain got its name due to the resemblance of a needle by its peak.

Geography
Needle Hill is located within Shing Mun Country Park. Stage 7 of the MacLehose Trail includes the summit of Needle Hill. The Shing Mun Tunnels pass through the base of Needle Hill.

History
Wolframite, a tungsten ore, was discovered at Needle Hill in 1935. It was mined there from 1938 to 1967.

See also
 List of mountains, peaks and hills in Hong Kong
 Mining in Hong Kong

References

Sha Tin District
Mountains, peaks and hills of Hong Kong